Rough Diamond or Rough Diamonds may refer to:


Minerals
 Rough diamond, a diamond which has not yet been cut

Television
 Rough Diamond (TV series), a drama series by BBC Northern Ireland
 Rough Diamond, the US title of the British TV comedy drama Diamond Geezer

Film
 The Rough Diamond, a 1921 American film; see List of Fox Film films
 Rough Diamonds (film), a 1994 Australian drama film starring  Jason Donovan

Music
 Rough Diamond (album), an album by British progressive rock band Rough Diamond
 Rough Diamond, the debut album of Madleen Kane
 Rough Diamonds (album), an album by Bad Company
 Rough Diamonds (EP), an EP by End of Fashion

See also
 Diamonds in the Rough (disambiguation)